The list of presidents of the Royal Society of Canada is a list of all the past and present presidents of the Royal Society of Canada.

 1882–1883 John William Dawson
 1883–1884 Pierre J. O. Chauveau
 1884–1885 T. Sterry Hunt
 1885–1886 Daniel Wilson
 1886–1887 Thomas E. Hamel
 1887–1888 George Lawson
 1888–1889 Sandford Fleming
 1889–1890 Raymond Casgrain
 1890–1891 George Monro Grant
 1891–1892 Joseph-Clovis-Kemner Laflamme
 1892–1893 John George Bourinot
 1893–1894 George M. Dawson
 1894–1895 James MacPherson Le Moine
 1895–1896 Alfred R. C. Selwyn
 1896–1897 Cornelius O'Brien
 1897–1898 Félix-G. Marchand
 1898–1899 Thomas C. Keefer
 1899–1900 William Clark
 1900–1901 Louis Fréchette
 1901–1902 James Loudon
 1902–1903 James A. Grant
 1903–1904 George T. Denison
 1904–1905 Benjamin Sulte
 1905–1906 Alexander Johnson
 1906–1907 William Saunders
 1907–1908 Samuel E. Dawson
 1908–1909 Joseph-Edmond Roy
 1909–1910 George Bryce
 1910–1911 R. Ramsay Wright
 1911–1912 William F. King
 1912–1913 William Dawson LeSueur
 1913–1914 Frank D. Adams
 1914–1915 Adolphe B. Routhier
 1915–1916 Alfred Baker
 1916–1917 Archibald B. Macallum
 1917–1918 William D. Lighthall
 1918–1919 Rodolphe Lemieux
 1919–1920 Robert F. Ruttan
 1920–1921 Arthur P. Coleman
 1921–1922 Duncan C. Scott
 1922–1923 J. Playfair McMurrich
 1923–1924 Thomas Chapais
 1924–1925 John C. McLennan
 1925–1926 William A. Parks
 1926–1927 James H. Coyne
 1927–1928 A. H. Reginald Buller
 1928–1929 Camille Roy
 1929–1930 Arthur S. Eve
 1930–1931 Charles Camsell
 1931–1932 Robert A. Falconer
 1932–1933 Francis E. Lloyd
 1933–1934 Léon Gérin
 1934–1935 W. Lash Miller
 1935–1936 Reginald W. Brock & George A. Young
 1936–1937 Lawrence J. Burpee
 1937–1938 Archibald G. Huntsman
 1938–1939 Victor Morin
 1939–1940 Henry Marshall Tory
 1940–1941 Robert C. Wallace
 1941–1942 Frederick W. Howay
 1942–1943 James Bertram Collip
 1943–1944 Olivier Maurault
 1944–1945 John K. Robertson
 1945–1946 Elwood S. Moore
 1946–1947 Harold A. Innis
 1947–1948 Walter P. Thompson
 1948–1949 Gustave Lanctôt
 1949–1950 Joseph A. Pearce
 1950–1951 John J. O'Neill
 1951–1952 Henry F. Angus
 1952–1953 Guilford B. Reed
 1953–1954 Jean Bruchési
 1954–1955 Edgar William R. Steacie
 1955–1956 George S. Hume
 1956–1957 William A. Mackintosh
 1957–1958 Thomas W. M. Cameron
 1958–1959 Pierre Daviault
 1959–1960 Henry G. Thode
 1960–1961 Merton Y. Williams
 1961–1962 Arthur R. M. Lower
 1962–1963 William H. Cook
 1963–1964 Maurice Lebel
 1964–1965 Léo Marion
 1965–1966 William Kaye Lamb
 1966–1967 Gerhard Herzberg
 1967–1968 James M. Harrison
 1968–1969 Léon Lortie
 1969–1970 Claude E. Dolman
 1970–1971 Roy Daniells
 1971–1972 Henry E. Duckworth
 1972–1973 John Tuzo Wilson
 1973–1974 Guy Sylvestre
 1974–1975 Claude Fortier
 1975–1976 Samuel D. Clark
 1976–1977 J. Larkin Kerwin
 1977–1978 Robert E. Folinsbee
 1978–1981 Robert E. Bell
 1981–1984 Marc-Adélard Tremblay
 1984–1987 Alexander G. McKay
 1987–1990 Digby J. McLaren
 1990–1992 Jules Deschênes
 1992–1995 John Meisel
 1995–1997 Robert Hall Haynes
 1997–1999 Jean-Pierre Wallot
 1999–2001 William Leiss
 2001–2003 Howard Alper
 2003–2005 Gilles Paquet
 2005–2007 Patricia Demers
 2007–2009 Yvan Guindon
 2009–2011 Roderick A. Macdonald
 2011–2013 Yolande Grisé
 2013–2015 Graham Bell
 2015–2017 Maryse Lassonde
 2017–2019 Chad Gaffield
 2019–2022 Jeremy N. McNeil

References

External links
 Royal Society of Canada - RSC Presidents (English PDF)
 Royal Society of Canada - RSC Presidents (French PDF)

 

Presidents of the Royal Society of Canada, List of
Presidents
Royal Society of Canada
Royal Society of Canada